Leucoptera coffeella (coffee leaf miner) is a moth in the family Lyonetiidae. It is found in every coffee-growing country in South America, Central America and the West Indies. It is considered one of the worst pest species of coffee.

Adults are entirely covered with silvery white scales. There are up to ten generations per year.

The larvae feed on Coffea arabica. They mine the leaves of their host plant, resulting in brown necrotic blotches.

Predators of Leucoptera coffeella include Protonectarina sylveirae and Synoeca cyanea, social wasps found in Brazil.

References

External links
Crop Compendium

Leucoptera (moth)
Leaf miners
Agricultural pest insects
Moths of North America
Moths of South America
Moths described in 1842
Taxa named by Félix Édouard Guérin-Méneville